Judo in the United Kingdom has a long history; the martial art being first introduced in 1899, and the first dojo, the Budokwai, being the oldest in Europe. The British Judo Association is the United Kingdom's official governing body for Judo - in which British citizens have won eighteen Olympic medals.

History
The Japanese martial art Judo was first introduced in the United Kingdom in 1899, when entrepreneur Edward William Barton-Wright sponsored a visit from a team of Japanese judoka with the intention of establishing a jujutsu school in England. The introduction was not immediately successful, but some members of the team, including Yukio Tani, remained in England and gradually cultivated public interest in Judo and other types of jujutsu through demonstrations, instruction, and prize fighting. The United Kingdom's first Judo dojo, the Budokwai, is the oldest in Europe and was founded by Gunji Koizumi in 1918 with Yukio Tani as its chief instructor.

Current organisation
There are currently several nationwide Judo associations in the United Kingdom: the British Judo Association, the British Judo Council, the Amateur Judo Association, the All England Judo Federation and Judo for all but to name a few. There are also numerous regional associations such as the Merseyside Judo Association. British Judo Association is the United Kingdom's official governing body for Judo and was established in 1948 under the chairmanship of Trevor Leggett.

Olympic success
British citizens have won nineteen Olympic medals in Judo since it was added to the Summer games in 1964. Neil Adams is the United Kingdom's most successful judoka, winning silver in the -71 kg category in 1980, and in the -78 kg category in 1984.

Two members of the United Kingdom's 2012 Olympic team received medals in Judo: Gemma Gibbons won silver in the -78kg women's category, and Karina Bryant won bronze in the +78 kg category. Gibbons' popularity surged after the win, with the number of followers on her Twitter account jumping from 600 to more than 22,600 in 24 hours, and the number of 'likes' on her Facebook page growing by 3000 per cent. A week later, the British Judo Association announced that its website had received thousands of search requests for local clubs since Gibbons'  and Bryant's wins.

Simon Jackson MBE (born 28 May 1972) is a visually impaired judoka and cyclist from Britain. He has competed in five Paralympic Games winning gold medals in three consecutive Games. Jackson is the only British person to win a Paralympic judo gold medal and the most successful judo competitor from the country. In addition to his Paralympic success he also won three world titles and 16 European gold medals. At the 2012 Paralympics, Ben Quilter won bronze in the -60 kg category, and Sam Ingram won silver in the -90 kg category.

Chelsie Giles won bronze at the Judo at the 2020 Summer Olympics – Women's 52 kg in Tokyo.

Writing
Journalist Mark Law was named 'Best New Writer' in the 2008 British Sports Book Awards for his book The Pyjama Game: A Journey into Judo, which was later published as Falling Hard: A Journey into the World of Judo in the United States. The book is a history of Judo in Japan, Britain, and other parts of the world, framed by Law's own experience of beginning Judo after his fiftieth birthday and working his way up to sho dan (first-degree black belt) at the Budokwai.

See also
Judo by country
Suffrajitsu - self-defense practiced by Suffragette, based on Jujutsu

References

External links
British Judo Association (official website)
British Judo Council (official website)
All England Judo Federation (Official website)
Merseyside Judo Association (official website)

Video
2012 Olympic -78 kg gold medal match: Kayla Harrison (United States) vs. Gemma Gibbons (United Kingdom) (IOC on YouTube)
2012 Olympic +78 kg bronze medal match: Karina Bryant (United Kingdom) vs. Iryna Kindzerska (Ukraine) (IOC on YouTube)